Al Jum'ah Mosque, also known as Bani Salim Mosque, Al-Wadi Mosque, Al-Ghubaib Mosque, or 'Atikah Mosque, is a mosque in Medina, Saudi Arabia. It is said by the locals to be where the Islamic prophet Muhammad and his companions did a Jumu'ah prayer for the first time during their route of hijrah (migration) from Mecca to Medina.

Location 
It is located southwest of Medina, near Wadi Ranuna', 900 meters north of Quba Mosque and 6 km from Al-Masjid an-Nabawi.

History 
During the route of hijrah from Mecca to Medina, on Monday, 12, Rabi' al-awwal, year 1 of Hijri calendar, the prophet and his muhajirin (companions of hijrah) stopped by Quba for four days. On the morning of Friday, they resumed the route to Medina, and stopped by at Wadi Ranuna' region and fulfilled the Jumu'ah prayer there. The region is called Jum'ah today.

Foundation 
It was built by rocks initially, then demolished and renovated several times. The mosque before renovation had 8 meters length, 4.5 meters width and 5.5 meters tall, and a dome made by red bricks. There was a yard with 8 meters length and 6 meters width attached to the east part. Renovation in 1988 by the Ministry of Awqaf of the Saudi government led by the king Fahd bin Abdul Aziz was accompanied by the demolition of the old part and the building of a new part, which includes a residence for an imam and a muezzin, a library, a madrasa Tahfidz al-Qur'an, a female prayer room and a bathroom. In 1991, the mosque was reopened to the public with a capacity of 650 pilgrims, and a main dome and four small domes.

Timeline of renovation
 The second renovation was conducted by the Umayyad Caliph Umar II.
 The third renovation was conducted during the time of Abbasid Caliphate between 734 and 748. 
 The fourth renovation was conducted by Syamsuddin Qawan during the 14th century. 
 Renovation during the time of Ottoman Sultanate was led by the Sultan Bayazid.
 Renovation in the middle of the 19th century was led by Sayyid Hasan Asy-Syarbatli.

See also 

 List of mosques in Medina
 List of mosques in Saudi Arabia
  Lists of mosques

References 

7th-century mosques
Mosques in Medina